Norbert Huda (born 5 March 1950, in Gelsenkirchen) is a German former diver who competed for West Germany in the 1968 Summer Olympics, in the 1972 Summer Olympics, and in the 1976 Summer Olympics.

References

1950 births
Living people
German male divers
Olympic divers of West Germany
Divers at the 1968 Summer Olympics
Divers at the 1972 Summer Olympics
Divers at the 1976 Summer Olympics
Sportspeople from Gelsenkirchen
20th-century German people